The FM-8 (Fujitsu Micro 8) is a personal computer developed and manufactured by Fujitsu in May 1981. It was Fujitsu's second microcomputer released to the public after the LKIT-8 kit computer, and the first in the "FM" series. The FM-8 was an early adopter of bubble memory technology. The FM-8 would later be replaced by two new models in November 1982 – the FM-11, aimed at businesses and the FM-7 aimed at the mass market.

Emulator
The computer is emulated by MESS.

References

6809-based home computers
Computer-related introductions in 1981
home video game consoles